Harbor (Tolowa: chit ) is an unincorporated community in Curry County, Oregon, United States. It is located across the Chetco River from the city of Brookings. For statistical purposes, the United States Census Bureau has defined Harbor as a census-designated place (CDP). The census definition of the area may not precisely correspond to local understanding of the area with the same name. The population of the CDP was 2,391 at the 2010 census.

History
The original name of the post office in the area was "Chetco", after the Chetco River. It was established in 1863 and moved several times until it closed in 1910. Meanwhile, a new post office named Harbor was established at the mouth of the Chetco River in 1894. The name of the office may have originated from the Chetco Harbor Land and Townsite Company.

Geography

Climate
Harbor, alike the Brookings area has a cool-summer Mediterranean climate (Köppen climate classification Csb). According to the Trewartha climate classification, it has a subtropical climate (despite being a little farther north than Chicago in latitude) and is one of the northernmost North American locations to have one.

It has cool winters during which intense rainfall is broken by weeks of cool, sunny weather.

Because of its location, Harbor is subject to winter (and less frequently summer) temperatures considered unusually warm for the Oregon Coast or for that matter, the North Coast of California. Temperatures can reach  throughout the year. This is due mostly to its situation at the foot of the Klamath Mountains, from which winds compress and warm the air flowing onto Harbor. This is called the Brookings effect or Chetco effect, similar to the warm dry Santa Ana winds of coastal Southern California. Daffodils and other bulbs generally bloom in February. In the lowlands, heavy fog is common in the summer while the coastal hills are generally sunny and cool.

Demographics

As of the census of 2000, there were 2,622 people, 1,333 households, and 798 families residing in the CDP. The population density was 1,399.6 people per square mile (541.4/km2). There were 1,691 housing units at an average density of 902.6 per square mile (349.1/km2). The racial makeup of the CDP was 94.20% White, 0.34% African American, 2.17% Native American, 0.19% Asian, 0.08% Pacific Islander, 0.92% from other races, and 2.10% from two or more races. Hispanic or Latino of any race were 3.05% of the population.

There were 1,333 households, out of which 11.0% had children under the age of 18 living with them, 52.6% were married couples living together, 5.6% had a female householder with no husband present, and 40.1% were non-families. 34.4% of all households were made up of individuals, and 18.6% had someone living alone who was 65 years of age or older. The average household size was 1.93 and the average family size was 2.41.

In the CDP, the population was spread out, with 11.5% under the age of 18, 4.1% from 18 to 24, 15.0% from 25 to 44, 28.5% from 45 to 64, and 40.9% who were 65 years of age or older. The median age was 60 years. For every 100 females, there were 97.3 males. For every 100 females age 18 and over, there were 96.0 males.

The median income for a household in the CDP was $22,829, and the median income for a family was $30,171. Males had a median income of $23,295 versus $21,692 for females. The per capita income for the CDP was $16,318. About 11.1% of families and 14.8% of the population were below the poverty line, including 15.9% of those under age 18 and 14.3% of those age 65 or over.

References

Census-designated places in Oregon
Unincorporated communities in Curry County, Oregon
1863 establishments in Oregon
Populated places established in 1863
Census-designated places in Curry County, Oregon
Unincorporated communities in Oregon
Populated coastal places in Oregon